Mejia, Mejía, Mexia, Mejias or Mejías may refer to:
Mejía (surname), a surname (and list of people with the name)
Mejía (canton), a canton in province of Pichincha, Ecuador
Mejia (community development block), an administrative division in Bankura Sadar subdivision, Bankura district, West Bengal, India
Mejia, Bankura, a village in Bankura district, West Bengal, India 
Mejía District, a district in the province of Islay, Arequipa, Peru; also, its capital
Mexia, Alabama,  unincorporated community in Monroe County, southern Alabama, U.S.
Mexia, town in limestone County, central Texas, U.S.
Mexia High School
Mexia Independent School District
 Mexia News, a newspaper published in Mexia, Texas
Mejía, Sucre, a municipality on the Gulf of Cariaco in state of Sucre, Venezuela

See also
 Ministro Ramos Mexía, a village and municipality, Río Negro Province, Argentina
 Ramos Mejía, a locale in La Matanza Partido, Greater Buenos Aires, Argentina
 Hospital Ramos Mejía, a hospital in Buenos Aires, Argentina
 Instituto Nacional Mejía, a secondary educational institution in Quito, Ecuador
 Tlacotepec de Mejía, a municipality in the state of Veracruz, Mexico
 Nochistlán de Mejía Municipality, a municipality in the state of Zacatecas, Mexico